Swapnil Singh (born 22 January 1991) is an Indian cricketer who plays for Baroda in domestic cricket. He is a bowling all-rounder who bats right-handed and bowls slow left-arm orthodox. He made his first-class debut for Baroda in 2006 at the age of 14 and was a member of the Mumbai Indians squad in 2008. In a match of the 2014–15 Syed Mushtaq Ali Trophy against Saurashtra, he had bowling figures of 4–0–19–6.

He was the leading run-scorer for Baroda in the 2017–18 Ranji Trophy, with 565 runs in six matches. In July 2018, he was named in the squad for India Blue for the 2018–19 Duleep Trophy.

References

External links
 

1991 births
Living people
Indian cricketers
Baroda cricketers
Uttarakhand cricketers
Mumbai Indians cricketers
People from Raebareli
Punjab Kings cricketers
India Blue cricketers